is a squadron of the Japan Air Self-Defense Force based at Iruma Air Base in Saitama Prefecture north of Tokyo. Under the authority of the Central Air Defense Force, the squadron operates Kawasaki T-4 and U-4 aircraft.

There is a "Silver Impulse" T-4 acrobatic team that performs during the annual Iruma Air Show. The name is derived from the official JASDF aerobatic team, Blue Impulse, and the fact that most of the pilots are aged 50 or over.

Tail markings

The squadron's aircraft tail markings are an arrow shape made of red, yellow and blue lines.

Aircraft operated

 Beechcraft Queen Air 65 (replaced by U-4)
 Kawasaki T-4 
 U-4

References

Units of the Japan Air Self-Defense Force